Christopher Lima da Costa (born 19 January 1988 in Libreville, Gabon) is a Gabonese-born São Toméan athlete. He competed in the 100 m event at the 2012 Summer Olympics but was eliminated in the preliminary round despite posting a personal best time of 11.56.

Da Costa also represented his country at the 100 metres in the 2011 World Championships in Athletics in Daegu and at the 100 metres in the 2013 World Championships in Athletics in Moscow. Both times he was eliminated in the preliminaries.

References

1988 births
Living people
Sportspeople from Libreville
São Tomé and Príncipe male sprinters
Olympic athletes of São Tomé and Príncipe
Athletes (track and field) at the 2012 Summer Olympics
Gabonese emigrants to São Tomé and Príncipe
World Athletics Championships athletes for São Tomé and Príncipe
Gabonese male sprinters